Sasstown is a town in the Sasstown District of Grand Kru County, Liberia. The population is 500.

It is served by Sasstown Airport.

Populated places in Liberia
Grand Kru County